Mikołaj Złotnicki (died 4 July 1694) was King's Cup-Bearer of the Crown (pl. cześnik koronny) since 1688.

References
Urzędnicy centralni i nadworni Polski XIV-XVIII wieku. Spisy, ed. Antoni Gąsiorowski, Kórnik 1992 ("Urzędnicy dawnej Rzeczypospolitej XII-XVIII wieku. Spisy", volume 10), p. 35.

1694 deaths
Polish courtiers
Year of birth unknown
17th-century Polish nobility